"Can I Sleep in Your Arms" is a single by American country music artist Jeannie Seely. Released in July 1973 under MCA Records, the song peaked at #6 on the Billboard Magazine Hot Country Singles chart, becoming Seely's first top ten solo hit since 1968. Additionally, "Can I Sleep in Your Arms" also became Seely's first major hit on the RPM Country Tracks chart in Canada, reaching #4. The song, written by Seely's one-time husband Hank Cochran, shares its melody with the traditional cowboy song "Red River Valley". The song has been recorded by Willie Nelson for his classic album Red Headed Stranger.

Chart performance

References 

1973 singles
Jeannie Seely songs
1973 songs
MCA Records singles
Songs written by Hank Cochran